Robert Warner Garland (May 1, 1937 – November 21, 2020) was an American screenwriter and film producer best known for his work in the films The Electric Horseman (1979) and No Way Out (1987).  He was a member of the Writers Guild of America.

Early life and education
Garland was born on May 1, 1937, in Brooklyn.  He attended St. John's College in Annapolis, Maryland.

Personal life and death
Garland retired from screenwriting in the mid-1990s and resided in several places around the world including Paris, France, Liguria and Key West.

Garland died from complications of dementia at the age of 83 in Baltimore on November 21, 2020.  He is survived by his son Michael, daughter-in-law Hedda and grandsons Jonah and Felix.

Filmography
The Electric Horseman (1979; screenwriter)
No Way Out (1987; screenwriter/producer)
The Big Blue (1988; screenwriter)

References

External links
 

1937 births
2020 deaths
People from Brooklyn
American film producers
St. John's College (Annapolis/Santa Fe) alumni
Film producers from New York (state)
Screenwriters from New York (state)
American male screenwriters
20th-century American screenwriters